Frontier Days may refer to:

 Frontier Days (rodeo), a rodeo event held by multiple cities 
 Frontier Days (album), an album released in 1984 by Del-Lords
 Cheyenne Frontier Days, an annual 10-day-long outdoor rodeo and festival in Cheyenne, Wyoming
 Frontier Days (film), a 1934 film starring Bill Cody